Exit 2 ( in Japan) is the sequel to the PlayStation Portable game Exit. It was released in Japan and Korea in 2006 and in Europe and Australia in 2007. A downloadable demo of the game was released in November 2006.

An Xbox Live Arcade (Xbox 360) version of the game was released on February 25, 2009.

Gameplay

Reception

The PSP version received "generally favorable reviews", while the Xbox 360 version received "mixed or average reviews", according to video game review aggregator Metacritic.  In Japan, Famitsu gave the PSP version a score of two eights, one seven, and one nine for a total of 32 out of 40.

References

External links
 

2006 video games
PlayStation Portable games
Xbox 360 Live Arcade games
Taito games
Puzzle-platform games
Single-player video games
Video games developed in Japan

ja:EXIT (ゲーム)#カンガエル EXIT